Nuff Said was a professional wrestling pay-per-view (PPV) event promoted by the National Wrestling Alliance (NWA). It took place on February 11, 2023, in Tampa, Florida. The name of the event was based on current NWA Worlds Heavyweight Champion Tyrus, who uses it as his catchphrase, and had a show by the same name on the Fox News streaming network Fox Nation.

Fourteen matches were contested at the event, including four on the pre-show. In the main event, Tyrus defeated Matt Cardona to retain the NWA Worlds Heavyweight Championship. In other prominent matches, Cyon defeated Homicide to retain the NWA National Heavyweight Championship, Kamille defeated Angelina Love in a No Disqualification match to retain the NWA World Women's Championship, and The Renegade Twins (Charlette Renegade and Robyn Renegade) defeated Pretty Empowered (Ella Envy and Kenzie Paige) to win the NWA World Women's Tag Team Championship.

Production

Background 
On December 23, 2022, NWA confirmed that Nuff Said will take place on February 11, 2023, from the Egypt Shrine Center in Tampa, Florida.

Storylines 
The event featured professional wrestling matches that involved different wrestlers from pre-existing scripted feuds and storylines. Wrestlers portrayed heroes, villains, or less distinguishable characters in scripted events that built tension and culminated in a wrestling match or series of matches. The eleventh season of the NWA's weekly flagship program, Powerrr, as well as the fifth season of its secondary program, NWA USA, featured storylines leading up to the event.

At NWA Hard Times 3, Tyrus defeated Trevor Murdoch and Matt Cardona to win the NWA Worlds Heavyweight Championship by pinning Murdoch. Previously, Cardona had defeated Murdoch to win the title himself, but a bicep tear in the summer of 2022 forced him to vacate the title. Murdoch would win it back in a four-way match at Alwayz Ready before eventually losing it in aforementioned three-way. Two months later, on the special January 31, 2023, live episode of Powerrr, Tyrus and Cardona had a contract signing for their title match at Nuff Said. Before the segment ended, however, both agreed to a six-man tag team match for next week's episode, each choosing two mystery partners. The winners of the match would then choose the stipulation for the world title match. There, Tyrus teamed with Blunt Force Trauma (Carnage and Damage) to defeat Cardona, Mike Knox, and Rolando Freeman, where Tyrus decided the stipulation be a simple one-fall match with all outside interference banned from ringside. Additionally, Bully Ray will provide special guest commentary for the match.

Also on the January 31 live episode of Powerrr, Thom Latimer and NWA World Women's Champion Kamille were scheduled to face Psycho Love (Fodder and Angelina Love) in an intergender tag team match. However, before their match, Psycho Love ambushed Latimer and Kamille on the entrance way, which also saw Fodder choke Latimer out with a singapore cane, causing the match to be cancelled. As a result of this, Love challenged Kamille for her title at Nuff Said in a no disqualification match, while Fodder and Latimer faced off in a singapore cane match.

On the February 4 episode of NWA USA, after Homicide was victorious in his match, he grabbed ring announcer/interviewer Kyle Davis, dragging him to the interview podium before he preceded to give a promo that had to be censored heavily due to explicit language. He ended the promo calling out the current NWA National Champion Cyon for a match at Nuff Said. He then called out Cyon's manager and father Austin Idol, then proceeded to try to get Austin to fight him before NWA backstage officials intervened. The match would be made official on February 5.

Also on the February 4 NWA USA, NWA Junior Heavyweight Champion Kerry Morton was confronted after his match by Alex Taylor and his manager Danny Dealz. Kerry had led Team Rock n' Roll, of which Taylor was a part of to win the Champions Series, which won title opportunities for each winning member. Danny would announce that Taylor was cashing in his Champion Series title shot for Morton's title at Nuff Said.

Following the last episode of Powerrr before the PPV on February 7, the NWA posted on Instagram a multi picture and video post which revealed several matches added to the card as part of the pre-show.

Event

Pre-show
Four matches were contested on the pre-show. In the opener, La Rosa Negra faced Missa Kate. In the end, Rosa Negra delivered a frog splash for the win.

Next, Dak Draper and Mims took on The Outlaws (with Chris Silvio Esq.). In the end, as Silvio was trying to get involved, but accidentally hit Blake "Bulletproof" Troop, allowing Draper to deliver an inside cradle for the win. 

Next, Odison faced Joe Alonzo. The former won after delivering a shoulder tackle and the F10. 

In the pre-show main event, Mercurio and Natalia Markova teamed up to take on Jennacide and Max the Impaler (with Amy Rose) . The former won after Markova delivered a double-armed DDT.

Preliminary matches
The main show opened with a Singapore Cane match between Thom Latimer and Fodder. In the end, Latimer delivered a piledriver, before locking in a kendo stick crossface for the submission win. 

Next, Kerry Morton (with Ricky Morton) defended the NWA Junior Heavyweight Championship against Alex Taylor (with Danny Dealz). In the closing stages, as Taylor was possibly looking for a Cradle Shock, Kerry escaped and planted Taylor with a Spinning Elbow Drop for the win.

Next, "Thrillbilly" Silas Mason (with Pollo Del Mar) took on Kratos. In the end, Kratos crashed face first into an exposed turnbuckle, causing extreme blood loss, and thus allowing Mason to deliver a head and arm choke on Kratos, which caused him to pass out. After the bell rang giving Silas the win, Silas proceeded to lick Kratos' blood off of his own hand.

In the eighth bout, Pretty Empowered defended the NWA World Women's Tag Team Championship against The Renegade Twins. In the end, The Renegades delivered Renegade's Revenge on Kenzie Paige, but Ella Envy broke the pin. Paige then pulled Robyn Renegade out of the ring, allowing Envy to look for a spinning heel kick, which Charlette Renegade blocked and turned into a schoolgirl pin for the win and thus, becoming new champions. 

Next, EC3 went one-on-one against Kevin Kiley Jr.. In the end, as Kiley was looking for a plancha on the outside of the ring, EC3 ducked out of the way and rolled Kiley back into the ring and made him tap out to The  Purpose. 

Next, La Rebelión defended the NWA World Tag Team Championship against Blunt Force Trauma (with Aron Stevens). In the end, La Rebelión delivered stereo enzeguiris before overpowering Carnage and suplexing Damage. La Rebelión delivered suicide dives, allowing Stevens to hit Bestia 666 with a loaded glove, causing a disqualification.  After the match, Blunt Force Trauma delivered a double flatliner to Bestia. 

Next, Trevor Murdoch faced Chris Adonis. In the latter stages, as Murdoch was looking for a top rope bulldog, Adonis avoided it and put on The Master Lock, forcing Murdoch to pass out giving Adonis the victory. 

The next match featured a No Disqualification match for the NWA World Women's Championship, contested between Kamille and Angelina Love. In the closing stages, Kamille brought out a table and put it against the turnbuckle. As Kamille was distracted, Love threw a trash can into Kamille before bitting the Botox Injection, but Kamille kicked out. As Love was trying to hit Kamille with the title belt, Kamille ducked out of the way and delivered a spear into the table for the 1-2-3 pin. 

The penultimate match saw Cyon (with Austin Idol defend the NWA National Heavyweight Championship against Homicide. In the end, as Homicide was looking for a frog splash, Cyon blocked him and hit a superplex. Homicide then delivered the middle finger to Cyon. Cyon then connected with the Rolling Death Valley Driver to pickup the victory.

Main event
The main event was contested between Tyrus and Matt Cardona for the NWA World Heavyweight Championship, with everyone banned from ringside. Tyrus bodyslammed Cardona and splashed him in the corner. Cardona sidestepped Tyrus and delivered the Three Reboots. Tyrus then inadvertently hit the referee. Rolando Freeman then came and attacked Tyrus with a steel chair. Cardona then hit the title belt on Tyrus, but Tyrus kicked out. As Cardona was in the corner, he moved and Tyrus again inadvertently hit another referee. Mike Knox came down to the ring and delivered a running crossbody to Tyrus. As Knox wanted to use the ring bell, special guest commentator Bully Ray threw Knox into the steel steps. Tyrus then delivered the Tongan Death Grip on Cardona to pickup the victory. After the match, Ray congratulated Tyrus, and Tyrus agreed to give Ray a title shot anytime he wanted.

Results

Notes

References

External links 
 

2023 in professional wrestling in Florida
February 2023 events in the United States
National Wrestling Alliance pay-per-view events
Professional wrestling shows in Tampa, Florida
2020s in Tampa, Florida